These are the Canadian number-one country albums of 1980, per the RPM Country Albums chart.

1980
Canada Country Albums